A list of notable Polish politicians of the defunct Liberal Democratic Congress.

A
 Tadeusz Aziewicz

B
 Jan Krzysztof Bielecki
 Michał Boni
 Józef Borzyszkowski

D
 Mirosław Drzewiecki

G
 Witold Gadomski
 Andrzej Gałażewski
 Zyta Gilowska
 Cezary Grabarczyk
 Ryszard Grobelny
 Rafał Grupiński

J
 Tadeusz Jarmuziewicz

K
 Filip Kaczmarek
 Sebastian Karpiniuk

L
 Janusz Lewandowski
 Krzysztof Lisek

N
 Sławomir Nowak

O
 Jerzy Orłowski

P
 Paweł Piskorski
 Jacek Protasiewicz

R
 Jan Rzymełka

S
 Grzegorz Schetyna
 Tomasz Siemoniak
 Andrzej Sośnierz

T
 Donald Tusk

W
 Jan Waszkiewicz
 Jacek Wojciechowicz